The New York 30 (NY-30) is a monohull sailboat designed by Nathanael Greene Herreshoff in 1904 as a class for the New York Yacht Club. It was the first one-design class designed for the Universal Rule of yacht measurement: "It is the first model I have worked on to be under the 1/4 beam length [Universal Rule] measurements, and I am well pleased with it, and also it has been more pleasure to work on it, as I have not had the restraint of getting the biggest boat possible for the W.L. length."

List of NY-30 yachts

Eighteen yachts were built to the NY-30 Class rule in 1905 by the Herreshoff Manufacturing Company.

Construction

The requirements from the NYYC members were: "A wholesome seaworthy craft, free from freak features, about 30 feet waterline, with short overhangs, moderate beam and draft, cabin house, complete but simple outfit for cruising, sail area about 1000 square feet."

N. G. Herreshoff proposed the following design: 43'6" LOA, 30' LWL, 8'10" beam, 6'3" draft; "framing best white oak; fastening bronze and copper; planking yellow pine, to be double below the turn of the bilge to the sheerstrake, the inner thickness to be of cypress; deck selected white pine canvas covered; Mahogany raised cabin house; outside lead ballast; sloop rigged"

The 18 boats were built at an impressive speed. Alera was built in 35 days and launched on January 3, 1905. Each of the other 17 were completed in one week intervals. All boats were ready for delivery by mid-April 1905. The Herreshoff Manufacturing Co was building three hulls at a time using molds. Other parts, designed to be interchangeable between one-design boats, were fabricated by other craftsmen.

Each boat was sold in 1905 for $4,200.

MIT Museum - Hart Nautical Gallery
The Francis Russell Hart Nautical Museum collection contains hundreds of NY-30 documents: original plans (profile, body plan, table of offsets), various Herreshoff Manufacturing Co records and historical photographs.

Events

1905 season
Thirteen NY-30 raced regularly during the 1905 first season. Based on thirty-eight races, the ranking was: 1 Cara Mia (Stuyvesant Wainwright), 2 Nautilus (Hanan brothers), 3 Alera, 4 Neola II, 5 Dahinda, 6 Atair, 7 Ibis, 8 Phryne (Harry Maxwell), 9 Banzai, 10 Minx, 11 Adelaide II, 12 Carlita, 13 Oriole, 14 Maid of Meudon, 15 Pintail, 16 Linnet, 17 Anemone II, 18 Tabasco.

References

Sailboats
Keelboats
Development sailing classes